The meridian 53° east of Greenwich is a line of longitude that extends from the North Pole across the Arctic Ocean, Europe, Asia, the Indian Ocean,  the Southern Ocean, and Antarctica to the South Pole.

The 53rd meridian east forms a great circle with the 127th meridian west.

From Pole to Pole
Starting at the North Pole and heading south to the South Pole, the 53rd meridian east passes through:

{| class="wikitable plainrowheaders"
! scope="col" width="115" | Co-ordinates
! scope="col" | Country, territory or sea
! scope="col" | Notes
|-
| style="background:#b0e0e6;" | 
! scope="row" style="background:#b0e0e6;" | Arctic Ocean
| style="background:#b0e0e6;" |
|-
| 
! scope="row" | 
| Hooker Island, Franz Josef Land
|-
| style="background:#b0e0e6;" | 
! scope="row" style="background:#b0e0e6;" | Barents Sea
| style="background:#b0e0e6;" |
|-
| 
! scope="row" | 
| Yuzhny Island and Mezhdusharskiy Island, Novaya Zemlya
|-
| style="background:#b0e0e6;" | 
! scope="row" style="background:#b0e0e6;" | Barents Sea
| style="background:#b0e0e6;" | Pechora Sea
|-
| 
! scope="row" | 
|
|-
| 
! scope="row" | 
|
|-
| 
! scope="row" | 
| Passing through the Garabogazköl lake  Passing just east of Türkmenbaşy
|-
| style="background:#b0e0e6;" | 
! scope="row" style="background:#b0e0e6;" | Caspian Sea
| style="background:#b0e0e6;" | Krasnovodsk Gulf
|-
| 
! scope="row" | 
| An island
|-valign="top"
| style="background:#b0e0e6;" | 
! scope="row" style="background:#b0e0e6;" | Caspian Sea
| style="background:#b0e0e6;" | Passing just west of the island of Ogurja Ada, 
|-
| 
! scope="row" | 
|
|-
| style="background:#b0e0e6;" | 
! scope="row" style="background:#b0e0e6;" | Persian Gulf
| style="background:#b0e0e6;" |
|-
| 
! scope="row" | 
| Emirate of Abu Dhabi
|-
| 
! scope="row" | 
|
|-
| 
! scope="row" | 
|
|-
| 
! scope="row" | 
|
|-
| style="background:#b0e0e6;" | 
! scope="row" style="background:#b0e0e6;" | Indian Ocean
| style="background:#b0e0e6;" | Gulf of Aden
|-
| 
! scope="row" | 
| Island of Samhah
|-valign="top"
| style="background:#b0e0e6;" | 
! scope="row" style="background:#b0e0e6;" | Indian Ocean
| style="background:#b0e0e6;" | Passing through the Amirante Islands, 
|-
| style="background:#b0e0e6;" | 
! scope="row" style="background:#b0e0e6;" | Southern Ocean
| style="background:#b0e0e6;" |
|-
| 
! scope="row" | Antarctica
| Australian Antarctic Territory, claimed by 
|-
|}

See also
52nd meridian east
54th meridian east

e053 meridian east